Blotter is the first full-length studio album by the American band Nightstick, released in 1996 on Relapse Records.

Track listing
 "Workers Of The World Unite!!" (Alex Smith, Robert Williams) – 9:56
 "Some Boys" (Lydia Lunch, Murray Mitchell) – 6:04
 "Set The Controls For The Heart Of The Sun" (Roger Waters) – 8:12
 "Mommy, What's A Funkadelic? 5/21/93" (George Clinton, Smith, Williams) – 5:44
 "Blotter: A. 'This Is A Pig,...', B. Only The Leaves In The Trees, C. Let's Rock! (Benedictus), D. Let's Rock (Adagio), E. Deep 6'D" (Kurt Habelt, Hank McNamee, Williams) – 10:57
 "Fellating The Dying Christ" (Williams) – 2:41

Personnel
 Alex Smith – bass, vocals
 Cotie Cowgill – guitars
 Robert Williams – drums

Nightstick (band) albums
1996 albums